Anatoli Mikhaylovich Ilyin (27 June 1931 – 10 February 2016) was a Soviet Russian footballer.

Honours
 Olympic champion: 1956.
 Soviet Top League winner: 1952, 1953, 1956, 1958, 1962.
 Soviet Top League runner-up: 1954, 1955.
 Soviet Top League bronze: 1957, 1961.
 Soviet Cup winner: 1958.
 Soviet Top League top scorer: 1954 (11 goals), 1958 (20 goals).
 Grigory Fedotov club member.

International career
He earned 31 caps and scored 16 goals for the Soviet Union from 1952 to 1959. He earned an Olympic gold medal at the 1956 Summer Olympics, scoring the game-winning goal of the Gold Medal match, and also participated in the 1958 FIFA World Cup.

Also was the author of the first goal in the history of Cups and European Championships, scoring a goal 4 minutes into the game against Hungary.

References

External links
Profile (in Russian)

1931 births
2016 deaths
Footballers from Moscow
Russian footballers
Soviet footballers
Soviet Union international footballers
Olympic footballers of the Soviet Union
Footballers at the 1952 Summer Olympics
Footballers at the 1956 Summer Olympics
Olympic gold medalists for the Soviet Union
1958 FIFA World Cup players
Soviet Top League players
FC Spartak Moscow players
Olympic medalists in football
Honoured Masters of Sport of the USSR
Soviet football managers
Medalists at the 1956 Summer Olympics
Association football forwards